Tommy Melkersson (born February 1, 1965) is a retired professional Swedish ice hockey player.

Melkersson was known as a hard playing defender, and won the Swedish championship with Brynäs IF twice; in 1993 and 1999.

References 

1965 births
Swedish ice hockey defencemen
Brynäs IF players
Living people